The following is a timeline of the history of the city of Sioux Falls, South Dakota, USA.

19th century
 1856 - Western Town Company develops townsite.
 1857 - Dakota Land Company develops townsite.
 1859 - Democrat newspaper begins publication.
 1867 - Permanent settlement established. 
 1868 - Sioux Falls becomes capital of Minnehaha County, Dakota Territory.
 1871 - Cataract House hotel in business.
 1872
 Sioux Falls Pantagraph newspaper begins publication.
 Calvary Church built.
 1873
 Sioux Falls Independent newspaper begins publication.
 Population: 593.
 1874 - Bank for Savings opens.
 1877
 Village incorporated.
 March: C.K. Howard elected president of village board of trustees.
 1878 - Sioux Falls Times newspaper begins publication.
 1879
 Irving School, Free Methodist Church, and Congregational Church built.
 Ladies Club library organized.
 1880 - Dakota Territorial School for Deaf Mutes established.
 1881
 Sioux Falls Argus newspaper begins publication.
 Penitentiary established.
 Queen Bee Mill in business.
 1882
 Telephone begins operating.
 First Baptist Church built.
 1883
 City chartered.
 April 3: Jacob Schaetzel elected mayor.
 Sioux Falls College founded.
 Sioux Falls Daily Press newspaper begins publication.
 1884 - Swedish Baptist Church built.
 1885 - Norberg Paints founded, still operating as the oldest family owned business in the state of South Dakota.
 1885 - Dakota Deutsche Zeitung German-language newspaper begins publication.
 1886 - Sioux Falls Bank established.
 1887
 Streetcars begin operating.
 Dakota Bell begins publication.
 1889
 Lutheran Normal School opens.
 German Congregational Emanuel Church and Episcopal Calvary Cathedral built.
 Roman Catholic Diocese of Sioux Falls established.
 1890
 Minnehaha County Courthouse built.
 Porter P. Peck becomes mayor.
 Population: 10,177.
 1891
 Jordan Methodist Church dedicated.
 Syd Dakota Ekko Norwegian-language newspaper relocates to Sioux Falls.
 1894 - Fremad Norwegian/English-language newspaper begins publication.
 1895 - Federal Building and United States Courthouse (Sioux Falls, South Dakota) constructed.
 1897 - Scandinavian Methodist Episcopal Church organized.
 1900
 Manchester Biscuit Company in business.
 Western Surety Company created by Joe Kirby.
 Cataract Hotel Burns down, leading to Sioux Falls Volunteer Fire Dept. becoming a paid department.
 Population: 10,266.

20th century

 1903 - Carnegie Free Public Library opens.
 1905 - Minnehaha Country Club founded.
 1907 - First Congregational Church (Sioux Falls, South Dakota) built.
 1908 - South Dakota Central Railway built.
 1909 - Morrell Packing Plant in business.
 1910 - Population: 14,094.
 1911 - Orpheum Theatre built.
 1912
 Eighth Street Bridge (Sioux Falls, South Dakota) and Central Fire Station constructed.
 McKennan Hospital established.
 1916   Eastside Fire Station constructed.
 1917 - Coliseum theatre built.
 1918
 Augustana College and Normal School established.
 St. Joseph Cathedral (Sioux Falls, South Dakota) completed.
 1922 - August 17: Three prisoners escape from State Penitentiary.
 1924
 Masonic Library founded.
 Josephine Martin Glidden Memorial Chapel built.
 1925 - State Theatre built.
 1928 - Pettigrew Museum established.
 1930 - Sioux Valley Hospital built.
 1936 - March: Two prisoners escape from State Penitentiary.
 1937 - City Hall built.
 1942 - Sioux Falls Army Air Base established.
 1949 - North American Baptist Seminary relocates to Sioux Falls.
 1963 - Great Bear Ski Area established.
 1966 - Pathfinder Nuclear Generating Station commissioned in nearby Brandon Township.
 1970 - Sioux Falls Regional Airport terminal built.
 1974 - Siouxland Heritage Museums established.
 1975 - Empire Mall in business.
 1981 - City of Sioux Falls Township Annexation Study was completed in November 1981
 1983 - December 20: Airplane accident.
 1986 - Qwest Tower (Sioux Falls) built.
 1988 - Sioux Falls Jazz and Blues Festival begins.
 1990 - Sister city relationship established with Potsdam, Germany.
 1993 - Sister city relationship established with Strabane, Northern Ireland.
 1995 - Central Baptist Church built.
 1998 - City website online (approximate date).
 1999 - Washington Pavilion of Arts and Science opens.
 2000 - Population: 123,975.

21st century

 2002 - Dave Munson becomes mayor.
 2005 - Zip Feed Tower demolished.
 2008 - Sister city relationship established with Newry and Mourne, Northern Ireland.
 2010
 Mike Huether becomes mayor.
 Population: 153,888.
 2011 - October 15: Occupy protest.

See also
 History of Sioux Falls, South Dakota
 Media in Sioux Falls, South Dakota
 List of museums in Sioux Falls
 National Register of Historic Places listings in Minnehaha County, South Dakota
 Timeline of South Dakota

References

Bibliography

 
 
 
 
 
 
  (series of articles about Sioux Falls), 2014-

External links

 Items related to Sioux Falls, various dates (via Digital Public Library of America).

Years in South Dakota
 
Sioux Falls
Sioux Falls, South Dakota